The 2nd Battalion, 377th Field Artillery Regiment, is the field artillery battalion assigned to the 2nd Infantry Brigade Combat Team (Airborne), 11th Airborne Division of the United States Army. This battalion is also known as the 2nd Airborne Battalion, 377th Field Artillery Regiment, or the 2nd Battalion, 377th Parachute Field Artillery Regiment (short form: 2-377 PFAR).

History

Constituted on 24 June 1921, the battalion served alongside the 101st Airborne Division during World War II. It was active in both Iraq and Afghanistan during the Global War on Terror. Formerly part of 4-25 IBCT(A) before its redesignation to the 2nd Infantry Brigade, 11th Airborne Division, It has been stationed at various locations in the United States as a training unit and is currently stationed at Fort Richardson, Alaska.

The battalion is currently composed of a Headquarters and Headquarters Battery (HHB), three cannon batteries (A, B, and C), and a forward support company (Company F, 725th Support Battalion).

The battalion's current mission statement is, "On order, 2-377th PFAR provides firepower over-match throughout the 2-11 IBCT(A) area of operations, to dominate all adversaries through the rapid and simultaneous application of fires and sensor platforms."

Lineage & Honors

Lineage
Constituted on 24 June 1921 in the Organized Reserves, as Battery B, 377th Field Artillery, an element of the 101st Division (later re-designated as the 101st Airborne Division).
Organized in November 1921 at Green Bay, Wisconsin.
Reorganized and re-designated on 20 January 1942 as Battery B, 377th Field Artillery Battalion.
Re-designated on 15 August 1942 as Battery B, 377th Parachute Field Artillery Battalion. It was concurrently inactivated, withdrawn from the Organized Reserves, and allotted to the Army of the United States.
Activated on 16 August 1942 at Camp Claiborne, Louisiana.
Deactivated on 20 November 1945 in France.
Re-designated on 18 June 1948 as Battery B, 515th Airborne Field Artillery Battalion.
Allotted on 25 Jun 1948 to the Regular Army.
Activated on 6 July 1948 at Camp Breckenridge, Kentucky.
Deactivated on 15 April 1949 at Camp Breckenridge, Kentucky.
Activated on 25 August 1950 at Camp Breckenridge, Kentucky.
Deactivated on 1 December 1953 at Camp Breckenridge, Kentucky.
Activated on 15 May 1954 at Fort Jackson, South Carolina.
Re-designated on 1 July 1956 as Batter B, 377th Airborne Field Artillery Battalion.
Deactivated on 25 April 1957 at Fort Campbell, Kentucky, and relieved from assignment to the 101st Airborne Division.
Re-designated on 19 July 1957 as Battery B, 377th Artillery.
Assigned on 1 September 1957 to the 82nd Airborne Division and activated at Fort Bragg, North Carolina.
Deactivated on 8 July 1965 at Fort Bragg, North Carolina.
Re-designated on 1 September 1971 as Batter B, 377th Field Artillery.
Relieved on 1 April 1974 from assignment to the 82nd Airborne Division; concurrently re-designated as Headquarters and Headquarters Battery, 2nd Battalion, 377th Artillery, and activated in Germany (Organic elements were concurrently constituted and activated).
Deactivated on 16 July 1987 in Germany.
Re-designated on 15 October 2003 as Battery B, 377th Field Artillery.
Activated on 16 December 2003 in Afghanistan.
Re-designated on 1 October 2005 as Battery B, 377th Field Artillery Regiment.
Re-designated on 16 November 2005 as the 2nd Battalion, 377th Field Artillery and assigned to the 2nd Brigade Combat Team, 11th Airborne Division (organic elements concurrently activated).

Campaign Participation Credit
World War II: Normandy (with arrowhead); Rhineland (with arrowhead); Ardennes-Alsace; Central Europe
War on Terrorism: Campaigns to be determined
Afghanistan: Consolidation I, Consolidation II, Consolidation III, Transition I
Iraq: National Resolution; Iraqi Surge

Note: The published US Army lineage lists "Campaigns to be determined" as of 1 October 2007. By comparing the battalion's deployment dates with War on Terrorism campaigns, it hass been estimated that the battalion is entitled to credit for participation in the six campaigns listed.

Decorations
Presidential Unit Citation (Army), Streamer embroidered NORMANDY
Presidential Unit Citation (Army), Streamer embroidered BASTOGNE
French Croix de Guerre with Palm, World War II, Streamer embroidered NORMANDY
Netherlands Orange Lanyard
Belgian Fourragere 1940
Cited in the Order of the Day of the Belgian Army for action in FRANCE AND BELGIUM
Belgian Croix de Guerre 1940 with Palm, Streamer embroidered BASTOGNE; cited in the Order of the Day of the Belgian Army for action at BASTOGNE

Heraldry

Distinctive Unit Insignia
377th Field Artillery Regiment Distinctive Unit Insignia

Coat of Arms
377th Field Artillery Regiment Coat of Arms

Beret Flash

A red shield-shaped embroidered item with a semi-circular base  inches (5.72 cm) in height and 1 7/8 inches (4.76 cm) in width, edged with a 1/8 inch (.32 cm) blue inner border and a 1/8 inch (.32 cm) red outer border. The beret flash was approved on 27 April 2004. It was re-designated for the 2nd Battalion, 377th Field Artillery Regiment on 9 June 2005.

Background Trimming

A red oval-shaped embroidered item 1 3/8 inches (3.49 cm) in height and  inches (5.73 cm) in width, edged with a blue inner border 1/8 inch (.32 cm) and a 1/8 inch (.32 cm) red outer border. The background trimming was approved on 29 April 2004. It was re-designated for the 2nd Battalion, 377th Field Artillery Regiment on 9 June 2005.

References

F 377 2
F 377 2
Field artillery battalions of the United States Army
Military units and formations in Alaska
Military units and formations established in 1921